Manneken Pis is a 1995 Belgian comedy-drama film directed by Frank Van Passel and written by Christophe Dirickx. It premiered in May 1995 at the Cannes Film Festival. It received the André Cavens Award for Best Film and four awards at the Joseph Plateau Awards. The film was selected as the Belgian entry for the Best Foreign Language Film at the 68th Academy Awards, but was not accepted as a nominee.

Cast
Frank Vercruyssen as Harry
Antje de Boeck as Jeanne
Ann Petersen as Denise
Wim Opbrouck as Desire

See also
List of Belgian submissions for the Academy Award for Best Foreign Language Film
List of submissions to the 68th Academy Awards for Best Foreign Language Film
Manneken Pis, statue

References

External links

1995 films
1990s romantic comedy-drama films
Belgian romantic comedy-drama films
Films directed by Frank Van Passel
1995 comedy films
1995 drama films